Anillomyrma is an Asian genus of ants in the subfamily Myrmicinae.

Distribution and habitat
Its two species are distributed in south, southeast and east Asia. A. decamera is known from Sri Lanka, India, Vietnam and China, and A. tridens from east Malaysia. Both species are likely subterranean and have been collected deep in sandy soil or on the ground of sandy areas, which may suggest that the distribution is affected by soil type.

Species
 Anillomyrma decamera (Emery, 1901)
 Anillomyrma tridens Bolton, 1987

References

External links

Myrmicinae
Ant genera
Hymenoptera of Asia